Elizabeth Waties Allston Pringle, (1845–1921), was an American plantation owner and writer, who published under the pseudonym Patience Pennington. She owned and managed Chicora Wood and White House, both rice plantations in Georgetown County, South Carolina.

Early life and education 
Pringle was born on May 29, 1845, at her family's summer home in Canaan Seashore, South Carolina, near Pawleys Island. Her father, Robert Francis Withers Allston, was a wealthy plantation owner and politician who served as the Governor of South Carolina from 1856 to 1858. At one point, Allston owned seven plantations, 630 enslaved people, and over fourteen hundred acres of land, on which rice and lumber were the primary crops. Pringle's mother was Adele Petigru Allston, sister of the politician James L. Petigru.

Pringle grew up on Chicora Wood plantation near Georgetown, South Carolina. She was educated by a governess before enrolling in Madame Acelie Togno's boarding school in Charleston, South Carolina at the age of nine or ten.

Career 
Pringle's father, Robert Allston, died in 1864, and much of his property was claimed by his creditors. Pringle began teaching in a boarding school until her family was again able to live at Chicora Wood.

Around 1880, Pringle bought the White House plantation from the family of her late husband after inheriting a large sum of money. She later gained ownership of Chicora Wood plantation at the age of 51, after her mother's death in 1896.

Facing decreased profits, Pringle began writing professionally to supplement her income. From 1904 to 1907, she published a weekly column about her life in The New York Sun. The column, as well as her subsequent books, were published under the pseudonym Patience Pennington.

In 1913, Pringle published installments of the column together in a book titled A Woman Rice Planter, with some editing to reformat the essays as diary entries. The book also included an introduction by author Owen Wiser and illustrations of plantation life by painter Alice R. Hunger Smith. A Woman Rice Planter reportedly sold very well and provided Pringle with increased financial stability. Pringle's second book, Chronicles of Chicora Wood, a memoir of her life from childhood through the American Civil War and Reconstruction, was published posthumously in 1922.

Pringle served as the South Carolina Vice-Regent for the Mount Vernon Ladies' Association from 1903 to 1921.

Personal life 
Elizabeth Allston Pringle married John Julius Pringle, a plantation owner and neighbor of her family's, on April 26, 1870. The couple lived together at White House plantation and had one child, a son who died in infancy.

John Julius Pringle died of malaria in 1876 when Elizabeth Pringle was 31 years old. Pringle then went live with her mother at Chicora Wood and helped care for her brother's children.

Pringle died at Chicora Wood on December 5, 1921.

References 

1845 births
1921 deaths
American women slave owners
20th-century American women writers
People from Charleston, South Carolina
The New York Sun people
People from Georgetown, South Carolina